SM U-86 was a Type U 81 submarine manufactured in the Germaniawerft, Kiel shipyard for the German Empire during World War I.

When the crew took to the lifeboats, U-86 surfaced, ran down all the lifeboats except one, and shot at the people in the water. Only the 24 people in the remaining lifeboat survived. They were rescued shortly afterwards and testified as to what had happened. The 234 others on board Llandovery Castle were lost, including fourteen nursing sisters.

, the former Hamburg America ocean liner SS Cincinnati, was torpedoed by U-86 on 1 July 1918 and sank the next day. Covington was the 17th largest ship sunk or damaged by U-boats during the war.

After the war, the captain of U-86 Helmut Patzig, and two of his lieutenants were arraigned for trial on war crimes, but Patzig fled to the Free City of Danzig, and his trial was stopped on 20 March 1931 by virtue of the Laws of Amnesty. Lieutenants Ludwig Dithmar and Johan Boldt were convicted and sentenced to four years in prison; they were released after four months.

Design
German Type U 81 submarines were preceded by the shorter Type UE I submarines. U-86 had a displacement of  when at the surface and  while submerged. The submarine was powered by two  engines for use while surfaced, and two  engines for use while submerged. She had two propeller shafts.

U-86 was fitted with six  torpedo tubes (four at the bow and two at the stern), twelve to sixteen torpedoes, and one  SK L/45 deck gun (from 1917). She had a complement of thirty-five (thirty-one crew members and four officers).

Fate 
U-86 was surrendered to the Allies at Harwich on 21 November 1918 in accordance with the requirements of the Armistice with Germany. Exhibited at Bristol in December 1918, along with UC-92, visitors could pay to go onboard with proceeds going to charity. She was then laid up at Portsmouth until scuttled in the English Channel on 30 June 1921.

Summary of raiding history

References

Notes

Citations

Bibliography

External links
 Canadian report on loss of Llandovery Castle 

World War I submarines of Germany
German Type U 81 submarines
1916 ships
Ships built in Kiel
U-boats commissioned in 1916
Shipwrecks in the English Channel
Maritime incidents in 1921